William Andrews, D.D. was an Anglican priest and educationalist in Ireland.

Andrews was educated at Trinity College, Dublin. He was Head Master of Kilkenny College from 1702 to 1714; and Archdeacon of Ossory from 1713 until 1736.

References

Alumni of Trinity College Dublin
Archdeacons of Ossory
18th-century Irish Anglican priests
18th-century Irish educators